Bonanza Peak is a tall peak in the North Cascades in the U.S. state of Washington and the Glacier Peak Wilderness of the Wenatchee National Forest. At  in elevation, it is the highest point in Chelan County, and the highest non-volcanic peak in Washington and the Cascade Range as a whole. The nearest higher peak is Glacier Peak,  to the southwest.

Bonanza Peak is flanked with three large glaciers: Company Glacier to the north, Mary Green Glacier to the east, and Isella Glacier to the south.

History
Bonanza Peak was originally named North Star Mountain, with a minor mountain to the southwest given the name Bonanza Peak. The USGS’ first topographic map of the region in 1904, however, mistakenly interchanged the names and the USGS naming was retained.

Bonanza Peak was first summited in 1937 by Curtis I. James, Barrie James, and Joe Leuthold, all members of the Mazamas.

Climate

Lying east of the Cascade crest, the area around Bonanza Peak is a bit drier than areas to the west. Summers can bring warm temperatures and occasional thunderstorms. Most weather fronts originate in the Pacific Ocean, and travel northeast toward the Cascade Mountains. As fronts approach the North Cascades, they are forced upward by the peaks of the Cascade Range, causing them to drop their moisture in the form of rain or snowfall onto the Cascades (Orographic lift). As a result, the North Cascades experiences high precipitation, especially during the winter months in the form of snowfall. Precipitation runoff from the mountain and meltwater from its glaciers drains to nearby Lake Chelan via Agnes, Company, and Railroad Creeks,

Geology

The North Cascades features some of the most rugged topography in the Cascade Range with craggy peaks, ridges, and deep glacial valleys. Geological events occurring many years ago created the diverse topography and drastic elevation changes over the Cascade Range leading to the various climate differences. These climate differences lead to vegetation variety defining the ecoregions in this area.

The history of the formation of the Cascade Mountains dates back millions of years ago to the late Eocene Epoch. With the North American Plate overriding the Pacific Plate, episodes of volcanic igneous activity persisted. In addition, small fragments of the oceanic and continental lithosphere called terranes created the North Cascades about 50 million years ago.

During the Pleistocene period dating back over two million years ago, glaciation advancing and retreating repeatedly scoured the landscape leaving deposits of rock debris. The "U"-shaped cross section of the river valleys are a result of recent glaciation. Uplift and faulting in combination with glaciation have been the dominant processes which have created the tall peaks and deep valleys of the North Cascades area.

See also

 Geography of the North Cascades
 List of mountain peaks of Washington (state)

Gallery

References

External links
 Bonanza and Martin Peaks: PBase aerial photo
 Weather forecast: Bonanza Peak

Mountains of Washington (state)
North Cascades of Washington (state)
Mountains of Chelan County, Washington